Judith Solomon Cohen (December 21, 1766 – April 5, 1837) was the matriarch of one of the earliest Jewish families in Baltimore, Maryland.

She married Israel I. Cohen, originally from Oberdorf Germany, on December 21, 1787 in England. The couple had emigrated to Richmond, Virginia by 1784, where Israel worked temporarily as a constable.  He was one of the founders of the Congregation Beth Shalome as well as a subscriber for shares of the Academy of Arts and Sciences of the United States of America.

The couple had nine children: Joshua (1788-1788); Jacob Jr. (1789-1869); Solomon (b. 1791); Philip (1793-1852); Maria (1794-1834); Mendes (1796-1879); Benjamin (1797-1845); David (1800-1847); Joshua (1801-1870); and Edward (1802-1803). 

When Israel died on July 29, 1803, his house and belongings were auctioned off because at that time women could not own property. Cohen moved her seven children to Baltimore, where she became a boarder of Shinah Solomon Etting. Later her son Benjamin would marry Etting's daughter Kitty and the couple became part of Baltimore's elite social circle. 

In 1813, Cohen's sons founded Cohen's Lottery and Exchange. The lottery was very successful and the brothers opened five branch offices in other cities. It published its own four-page newspaper, Cohen's Gazette and Lottery Register from 1814 until 1830, containing lottery as well as financial news. In 1831, they opened Jacob I. Cohen, Jr. and Brothers Banking House.

The Cohen family lived in a large house on North Charles Street where they kept kosher and held daily services. In the 1850s, they were the sponsors of the short-lived Sephardic Congregation. 

Judith Solomon Cohen died in Baltimore on April 5, 1837. The family purchased a tract for her burial on Saratoga Street; it would be used for family burials until the 1970s, when the family was reinterred at Baltimore Hebrew Cemetery.

See also 

 History of the Jews in Baltimore

References

1766 births
1837 deaths
People from Baltimore
Jewish women
19th-century American women
People from Richmond, Virginia
English emigrants to the United States